Rudolf Schulten (16 August 1923 – 27 April 1996)—professor at RWTH Aachen University—was the main developer of the pebble bed reactor design, which was originally invented by Farrington Daniels. Schulten's concept compacts silicon carbide-coated uranium granules into hard, billiard-ball-like graphite spheres to be used as fuel for a new high temperature, helium-cooled type of nuclear reactor.

AVR reactor
The idea took root and in due course a 46 MWth (megawatt thermal) experimental pebble bed reactor (the Arbeitsgemeinschaft Versuchsreaktor, or AVR reactor) was built at the Jülich Research Centre in Jülich, West Germany. It operated for 21 years but was shut down in the wake of Chernobyl.

HTR-MODUL project
Some of the last pebble fuel tested in the AVR was for a low enriched uranium (LEU) fuel cycle anticipated for use in the HTR-MODUL project design by Interatom/SIEMENS.

South African Pebble Bed Modular Reactor 

Based on the AVR, South Africa along with international partners developed an updated version called the PBMR. The TRISO fuel elements could use either Thorium or U-235 in the form of LEU as fuel. The project was cancelled in 2010 due to lack of investment, even though the technology has essentially been completely developed.

HTR-10 China, HTR-PM
The technology is currently being developed mainly in China who currently operate a 10 MW test reactor (HTR-10) of this type. The Chinese are, as of 2015, building a commercial pebble-bed reactor: HTR-PM, with two 100MWe reactors. One achieved a sustained chain reaction (criticality) in Sept 2021.

References

 Kirchner, Ulrich: Der Hochtemperaturreaktor - Konflikte, Interessen, Entscheidungen, Campus Verlag, Frankfurt/New York, Campus Forschung Vol. 667, 1991. 

Werner von Siemens Ring laureates
Academic staff of RWTH Aachen University
Commanders Crosses of the Order of Merit of the Federal Republic of Germany
1920 births
1996 deaths
Academic staff of the Karlsruhe Institute of Technology